Henry James O'Farrell (183321 April 1868) was the first person to attempt a political assassination in Australia. On 12 March 1868, he shot and wounded Prince Alfred, Duke of Edinburgh, the second son and fourth child of Queen Victoria.

Biography
O'Farrell was born in Arran Quay, Dublin, Ireland, the youngest child of William O'Farrell, a butcher. The family moved to Liverpool, then later migrated to Victoria. Henry O'Farrell was an alcoholic, and had been released from a lunatic asylum immediately before the attempted assassination. O'Farrell  had briefly been employed by his brother, a Melbourne solicitor, who had offices in Ballarat, and is therefore sometimes described as a law clerk. But O'Farrell's most recent occupation was selling fruit and vegetables in Ballarat's Haymarket.

Assassination attempt
In 1868, Prince Alfred, then 23 years old, went on a world tour, which included the first royal visit to Australia. There were planned stops in Adelaide, Melbourne, Brisbane, Sydney and many other places. On 12 March, the Prince attended the Sailor's Picnic in the harbourside suburb of Clontarf, New South Wales.

O'Farrell, aged 35 at the time, came up behind the Prince and fired a revolver into his back. The assassin was immediately tackled by William Vial, a local coach-maker. For his actions, he was later presented with the prince's fob watch. Vial, together with bystanders, quickly subdued O'Farrell. The assassination attempt outraged the attending crowd, and O'Farrell was severely beaten and nearly lynched by the mob before police arrested him and removed him to safety.
 
The Prince was shot in the back just to the right of the spine. The wound was serious, but not fatal. The Prince was hospitalised for two weeks, and cared for by six nurses trained by Florence Nightingale, who had arrived in Australia that February under Matron Lucy Osburn.

The attack caused great embarrassment in the colony, and led to a wave of anti-Catholic and anti-Irish sentiment, directed at all Irish people, including Protestant Loyalists. The next day, 20,000 people attended an "indignation meeting" to protest "yesterday's outrage". O'Farrell first claimed, falsely, to be under orders from the Fenian Brotherhood. Although anti-British and anti-Royalist, he later denied being a Fenian.

Trial and execution
O'Farrell was tried at Sydney on 30 March 1868. The barrister with the thankless task of defending him was Butler Cole Aspinall, who had previously defended the rebel leaders of the Eureka Stockade. Aspinall sought to have O'Farrell found not guilty by reason of insanity. He cited O'Farrell's history of mental illness and recent release from an asylum. O'Farrell was convicted and sentenced to death by judge Alfred Cheeke. Prince Alfred himself tried unsuccessfully to intercede and save his would-be killer's life. O'Farrell was hanged on 21 April 1868 in the Darlinghurst Gaol at the age of 35.

Recovery of Prince Alfred
Prince Alfred soon recovered, and returned home in early April 1868. On 24 March, the New South Wales Legislative Assembly voted to erect a memorial building. In order "to raise a permanent and substantial monument in testimony of the heartfelt gratitude of the community at the recovery of HRH". It was to be the Prince Alfred Hospital. Queen Victoria permitted the use of the term "Royal", so the memorial building was the Royal Prince Alfred Hospital. It was built using funds raised by public subscription, and is today an important hospital in New South Wales.

Sir Henry Parkes, a Minister in the colonial government, and future Premier of New South Wales, stirred up persecution of Irish Catholics in the colony after O'Farrell's attack. Parkes claimed that the mad killer's initial claims of being Fenian were true and that there were extensive Fenian conspiracies at work. When Canadian politician and anti-Fenian D'Arcy McGee was killed by a Fenian on 7 April, the excitement increased. Soon the excitement died down, and the public began questioning Parkes' unsupported claims. These became an embarrassment, and he resigned as a Minister in September.

In popular culture
The event was dramatised in the play Duke of Edinburgh Assassinated or The Vindication of Henry Parkes.

External links
McKinlay, Brian The First Royal Tour, 1867–1868, (London: Robert Hale & Company, c1970, 1971), 200p. 
Travers, Robert The Phantom Fenians of New South Wales (Kangaroo Press, 1986), 176p. .
Murphy, Peter Fenian Fear (Peter Murphy, 2018), 177p. . www.fenianfear.com

References

1803 births
1868 deaths
1868 crimes in Australia
Executed Irish people
Failed assassins
People executed by New South Wales
People executed for attempted murder
Irish people executed abroad
Executed Australian people
19th-century Irish people
People executed by Australian colonies by hanging
Irish emigrants to Australia